City of London Academy Highgate Hill is a coeducational secondary school and sixth form located in the Islington area of London, England.

The site of the current school was previously known as Mount Carmel Catholic College for Girls. Mount Carmel was a Roman Catholic, girls-only school. It was originally located in Eden Grove, Holloway before moving to the present location. It school formally closed on 31 August 2017.

The next day City of London Academy Highgate Hill opened on the same site. City of London Academy Highgate Hill is a free school sponsored by the City of London Academies Trust.

References

External links
City of London Academy Highgate Hill official website

Secondary schools in the London Borough of Islington
Free schools in London